The Coppin State Eagles represent Coppin State University, a historically African-American institution in Baltimore, in NCAA Division I sports as members of the Mid-Eastern Athletic Conference. The Gold and Blue are represented by fourteen (14) teams, including men's and women's basketball, men's and women's cross country, men's and women's tennis, women's bowling, softball, volleyball, baseball, and both women's and men's indoor and outdoor track and field.  They do not have a football team.

Teams

References

External links